Xanthostemon glaucus is a species of plant in the family Myrtaceae. It is endemic to New Caledonia.

References

Endemic flora of New Caledonia
glaucus
Critically endangered plants
Taxonomy articles created by Polbot